The 2020 The Spring League Fall season was the first Fall season, and the fifth overall in league history, which was played in San Antonio, Texas.

The Spring League (TSL) began its fall season on Oct. 27 with six teams competing in a 12-game format over four weeks in a bubble environment, based out of the San Antonio Alamodome. The concept was first conceived as a partnership with Canadian Football League (CFL) for proposed September return in abbreviated season. Fox Sports 1 aired games on Tuesday and Wednesday.

The league stated that this time the players did not pay to attend, but Spring League CEO Brian Woods later explained that some players did pay, while select others did not.

In November 2020, amid the COVID-19 pandemic, TSL announced that the league would be cancelling the final week of the season. The top two teams met in the final on December 15, at the Camping World Stadium in Orlando, Florida. The Generals	beat the Aviators 37–14, and won the first TSL championship.

Teams
All six teams will had brands and names, including the returning Generals (originally from Austin), Aviators (re-branded from Las Vegas Hughes), and four new teams the Blues (modified from the FXFL Blacktips), Alphas (a wolf motif), Conquerors and Jousters.

Coaches
All of the league teams are coached by coaches with vast experience in college or minor leagues and all, except Chuck Bresnahan, has a head coaching experience, while all apart from Steve Fairchild were involved in the United Football League during its four-year existence: 
Steve Fairchild* (Alphas)
Terry Shea* (Aviators)
Ted Cottrell (Blues)
Jerry Glanville (Conquerors)
Bart Andrus* (Generals)
Chuck Bresnahan (Jousters)
 Returning coach from previous seasons

Some of the more recognizable assistants were June Jones (Conquerors) who was later replaced by Kevin Gilbride, Mike Singletary and Jeff Reinbold (Generals), Art Valero and Drew Tate (Alphas), Robert Ford (Jousters) and Eric Hicks (Aviators).

Players
With the cancellation of the XFL 2021 season and the CFL not playing in 2020, the Spring League featured more recognizable names from years past. Some of the bigger names were NFL veteran and former alumni QB Zach Mettenberger (Generals), the CFL's 2019 passing touchdowns leader McLeod Bethel-Thompson (Aviators), former Ohio State Buckeyes QB J. T. Barrett (Alphas) and 2018 TSL MVP Bryan Scott (Generals). After the second week the Conquerors added 2020 NFL draft pick and former Hawaii QB Cole McDonald, while former North Texas QB Devlin Isadore was the first TSL to be traded when he joined Aviators after playing for the Alphas. The league also featured players from smaller schools that didn't get an NFL opportunity after the NFL draft with the cancellation of the preseason and mini-camps.

Games

 Overtime

Standings

Controversy
Before the week 3 games, rumors started to arise that the coaches discussed boycotting after not getting paid for their work, and agents of players had also come forward with allegations that in the past the Spring League failed to cover lodging costs as promised. The league's CEO Brian Woods would later argue that "the payroll system had to verify checking accounts before issuing the direct deposits, which delayed the payments".

After week 3, Bresnahan stepped down as head coach of the Jousters, because of a miscommunication with the league resulting from an outbreak of COVID-19 in the team. The Jousters had several unspecified players test positive, resulting in a forfeit game against the Alphas, and cancellation of the scheduled broadcast. Offensive assistant Robert Ford was supposed to take over the head-coach duties, but as some of the other coaches had to leave as they were considered at high-risk, the Jousters final game was cancelled, making them the only team whose games were not broadcast.

Before week 4, Jousters player Cory Johnson released a YouTube video accusing Woods (referred to as "the league owner") of mistreating Johnson's teammates (no insurance for players, no trainers on staff, and no guarantee that players who pay to be there get a fair look), disregarding COVID-19 protocols and threatening to prevent them of personal game film. Other players complained of poor meals and having to pay for treatment, parking and hotel rooms. Furthermore, according to several players accounts, they paid to play in the league but instead just participate in three-day "showcase" and were sent home. Following these reports, the league announced that the remaining scheduled games will be cancelled due to new positive COVID-19 test results and all players were sent home immediately.

Brian Woods later rejected most complaints and said that the players did not stay at the hotel and are responsible for the COVID-19 outbreak. He stated that the sick players had an option to stay at the hotel if they wanted to. Woods stated he planned to go ahead with the Championship Game on a later date.

Signees to professional leagues
After TSL season some of the players signed or received opportunity with National Football League (NFL) and Canadian Football League (CFL) teams. Additionally, all participating players were invited to Fan Controlled Football tryouts for free.

NFL

CFL

References

The Spring League
The Spring League Fall season